Kolsberg is a neighbourhood in the city of Kristiansand in Agder county, Norway. It is located in the borough of Grim. The apartments at Kolsberg in the hills can be seen from the European route E39 highway passing to the south.

References

Geography of Kristiansand
Neighbourhoods of Kristiansand